Kraljevo Sports Hall is a multi-use indoor arena in Kraljevo, Serbia. The arena has a total capacity of 6,000. It is used mostly for team handball and basketball matches since it is a home arena of basketball teams KK Sloga and KK Mašinac as well as volleyball team OK Ribnica.

The arena was officially opened on 11 February 2015.

In March 2015 Serbia played against Croatia for the Davis Cup first round, while the following year Serbia Fed Cup team received Spain for the Fed Cup World Group II at this stadium.

See also
 List of indoor arenas in Serbia

References

Indoor arenas in Serbia
Basketball venues in Serbia